Mitch Donahue (born February 4, 1968) is an American former professional football player who was a linebacker in the National Football League (NFL).  He played college football as a defensive lineman for the Wyoming Cowboys and was a two-time Western Athletic Conference (WAC) Defensive Player of the Year. He later spent four seasons in the National Football League.

He was born in Los Angeles, and graduated in 1986 from Billings West High School in Billings, Montana.

References

External links
Stats
1991 NFL Draft

1968 births
Living people
Players of American football from Los Angeles
American football linebackers
American football defensive ends
Wyoming Cowboys football players
San Francisco 49ers players
Denver Broncos players